The Gordon Elliott Show is an American daytime tabloid talk show hosted by Australian journalist Gordon Elliott. It ran for three seasons in syndication from September 12, 1994 to September 5, 1997, and was produced by CBS Productions and distributed by 20th Television.

References

External links

1994 American television series debuts
1997 American television series endings
1990s American television talk shows
First-run syndicated television programs in the United States
English-language television shows
Television series by CBS Studios
Television series by 20th Century Fox Television